Fury and Hecla Strait is a narrow (from  wide) Arctic seawater channel located in the Qikiqtaaluk Region of Nunavut, Canada.

Geography
Situated between Baffin Island to the north and the Melville Peninsula to the south, it connects Foxe Basin on the east with the Gulf of Boothia on the west. Water flow in the strait is sometimes westerly and sometimes easterly – there are diurnal and semidiurnal components to the flows; tidal and subtidal effects also play a role. The strait provides Arctic Ocean drainage for Hudson Bay via Foxe Basin. Several islands of the Arctic Archipelago are located inside the strait: Saglirjuaq (Liddon Island), Simialuk (Ormonde Island) and Saglaarjuk (Amherst Island) are the largest ones.

History of exploration
The Strait is named after the Royal Navy ships HMS Fury and HMS 
Hecla, which encountered the strait in 1822 during an expedition led by Sir William Edward Parry. Both ships became stuck in ice in October 1821, and remained immobile for eight months. During this time, the expedition learned of the strait from the native Inuit. Two men from the expedition set out with four Inuit on sled to assess the strait. Captain Parry would later accompany another trip to the strait.

In 1948, USS Edisto and USCGC Eastwind icebreakers succeeded in crossing the strait from east to west, and HMCS Labrador succeeded in crossing the strait from west to east in 1956.

In August 2016, David Scott Cowper and son, Freddy Cowper, aboard M/V Polar Bound became the first vessel to transit Fury and Hecla Strait from east to west during their successful Route-7 West Northwest Passage.

"The Ping"
Fury and Hecla Strait is the site of an unexplained phenomenon called "The Ping", alternatively described as a "hum" or "beep" heard throughout summer 2016. It was heard by various residents of the town of Igloolik, and local hunters blamed it for a comparative scarcity of marine game animals that year. Canadian military authorities performed an airborne survey of the area but reported nothing unusual, nor did they have any knowledge of allied or foreign submarine activity in the area.

See also
 List of unidentified sounds

References

Works cited

Further reading

 Chandler, F. W. Geology of the Late Precambrian Fury and Hecla Group, Northwest Baffin Island, District of Franklin. Ottawa, Canada: Energy, Mines and Resources Canada, 1988. 
 Ciesielski, A. The Basement to the Fury & Hecla Group Lithologic, Structural and Geochemical Data, Northwest Baffin Island. Ottawa, Ont: Geological Survey of Canada, 1992.
 Hall, Charles Francis, and J. E. Nourse. Narrative of the Second Arctic Expedition Made by Charles F. Hall His Voyage to Repulse Bay, Sledge Journeys to the Straits of Fury and Hecla and to King William's Land, and Residence Among the Eskimos, During the Years 1864-'69. Washington: G.P.O., 1879.
 Lee, Geoffrey. Note on Arctic Palaeozioc Fossils from the "Hecla" and "Fury" Collections. 1912.

Straits of Qikiqtaaluk Region
Bodies of water of Baffin Island